The collared eel (Kaupichthys nuchalis) is an eel in the family Chlopsidae. It was described by James Erwin Böhlke in 1967. It is a tropical, marine eel known from coral reefs in the western Atlantic Ocean, including Texas, USA; the Bahamas, the Antilles, northern South America, the northwestern Gulf of Mexico, and the Caribbean. It is a benthic, solitary eel that primarily resides in tubular sponges.

The collared eel exhibits biofluorescence, that is, when illuminated by blue or ultraviolet light, it re-emits it as orange, and appears differently than under white light illumination. Biofluorescence may assist in intraspecific communication and camouflage.

References

collared eel
Fish of the Caribbean
Fish of the Dominican Republic
Taxa named by James Erwin Böhlke
collared eel